"Cold Shoulder" is a song by the British singer-songwriter Adele, released from her first album 19. It was released digitally in Ireland on 20 April 2008 and in the UK on 21 April 2008. "Cold Shoulder" is the only song on the album to be produced by Mark Ronson. The former Jamiroquai bass guitarist Stuart Zender plays bass guitar on the song and is also part of Ronson's touring band. Adele performed the song on Friday Night with Jools Holland on 8 February 2008 and on Saturday Night Live during the 18 October 2008 show. A remix by Basement Jaxx also received airplay and is digitally available.

Critical reception
The song was met with positive reviews from critics, with most praising Adele's vocals and the song's lyrics. However, Clash Magazine described the song and Ronson's production as having "high concept" and "slick production" that "seems as soulless as a Michael Bay film".

Music video
The music video for "Cold Shoulder" was shot in February 2008 in London. It had airplay on UK music channels and shows Adele singing in a darkened room among melting ice statues, each with looks of despair. The music video ends with many of the statues melted and the final shots of Adele interfade into those of the statues. As of October 2021, the music video has received over 34 million views on YouTube.

Track listings
UK – CD and 7-inch vinyl
 "Cold Shoulder" 3:15
 "Now and Then" 3:24

iTunes EP Cold Shoulder – EP
 "Cold Shoulder"
 "Cold Shoulder" 
 "Cold Shoulder" 
 "Cold Shoulder" 
 "Cold Shoulder" 
 "Cold Shoulder"

Credits and personnel
Vocals – Adele
Songwriting – Adele Adkins, Sacha Skarbek
 Production, drums, guitar, programming, keyboards - Mark Ronson
 Keyboards - Jason Silver
 Guitar - Michael Tighe, Matt Allchin
 Bass guitar - Stuart Zender
 Percussion - Pete Biggins
 Glockenspiel - Sam Koppelman
 String arrangements - Chris Elliott

Release history

Charts

Weekly charts

Year-end charts

Certifications

References

2008 singles
2008 songs
Adele songs
Song recordings produced by Mark Ronson
Songs written by Adele
Songs written by Sacha Skarbek
Trip hop songs
XL Recordings singles